The Reform Progressive Party (Partido Progressista Reformador, PPR) was a centre-right Brazilian party, formed by the fusion of the Democratic Social Party (PDS) and the Christian Democratic Party (PDC) in 1993. Two years later the party, along with the Progressive Party, formed a new party called Brazilian Progressive Party. The leader of the party was Esperidião Amin, former governor of Santa Catarina in 1983-87.

References 

Political parties established in 1993
Political parties disestablished in 1995
Defunct political parties in Brazil
1993 establishments in Brazil
1995 disestablishments in Brazil